Jules Ninine (born October 8, 1903 in Pointe-a-Pitre, Guadeloupe and died April 26, 1969 in Paris) was a politician from Guadeloupe who served and represented Cameroon in the French National Assembly from 1946-1958 .

He served as the President of the Legislative Assembly of Cameroon from May 1957 to October 1958.

References 

1st page on the French National Assembly website
2nd page on the French National Assembly website

1903 births
1969 deaths
People from Pointe-à-Pitre
Presidents of the National Assembly (Cameroon)
Guadeloupean politicians
French Section of the Workers' International politicians
Deputies of the 1st National Assembly of the French Fourth Republic
Deputies of the 2nd National Assembly of the French Fourth Republic
Deputies of the 3rd National Assembly of the French Fourth Republic